María Soledad Ayuso Domínguez (born May 19, 1943 in Madrid) better known as Marisol Ayuso is a Spanish stage, movie and television actress. Her father, Pedro Pablo Ayuso, was also an actor, and her mother, María Soledad Domínguez Giraldes, was an aristocrat (the granddaughter of the Viscount of Troncoso).

She has a daughter with the former director of the General Spanish Society of Authors (SGAE) who was the owner of the disco "Pachá" in the 1980s.

Filmography

Movies 
 Aventuras de Don Quijote. (1960)
 Darling (1961)
 Todos eran culpables (1962)
 Vampiresas 1931 (1962)
 El pecador y la bruja (1964)
 Operación cabaretera (1967)
 Una bruja sin escoba (1967)
 ¡Cómo está el servicio! (1968)
 Objetivo: bi-ki-ni (1968)
 Llaman de Jamaica, Mr. Ward (1968)
 Verano 70 (1969)
 Cuatro noches de boda (1969)
 Mi marido y sus complejos (1969)
 The Complete Idiot (1970)
 Yo soy una bellaca (1970)
 Aunque la hormona se vista de seda... (1971)
 Siete minutos para morir (1971)
 Lo verde empieza en los Pirineos (1973)
 Cómo matar a papá... sin hacerle daño (1975)
 Ésta que lo es... (1977)
 Loca por el circo (1982)
 Esto es un atraco (1987)
 Desmadre matrimonial (1987)
 La hora de los valientes (1998)

Television 
 Estudio 1 (1967–1979)
 Fin de año con Lina Morgan (1992)
 Celeste... no es un color (1993)
 Hostal Royal Manzanares (1996–1998)
 Don Juan en Alcalá 2005 (2005)
 Aída (2005-2014, final de la serie)

References

Sources and external links 
 http://www.geneall.net/H/per_page.php?id=372731
 

1943 births
Living people
20th-century Spanish actresses
21st-century Spanish actresses
Spanish vedettes
Actresses from Madrid